The National Party or Montt-Varist was a Chilean political party formed in 1857 as a split from the Conservatives by the supporters of President Manuel Montt and Interior Minister Antonio Varas. The National Party had a liberal-conservative ideology and was primarily supported by middle-high businessmen, bankers and journalists. The Welsh-born Edwards family was a bigger financer of the party, along with the aristocratic Balmaceda, who was linked to the Liberal Party. The party never was more than an influential third party, and since the late 1910s its influences declined considerably, stopping from participating to national elections after 1924, finally merging into the United Liberal Party in 1933. The monttvarista National Party is not to be confused with the National Party formed in 1966.

Electoral history

Presidential election

Congress election

See also 
:Category:National Party (Chile, 1857) politicians

Notes

References

Political parties established in 1857
Political parties disestablished in 1933
1857 establishments in Chile
1933 disestablishments in Chile
Defunct political parties in Chile